Lagerstroemia duperreana is a species of flowering plant in the family Lythraceae. It is found in Indochina, including in southern Vietnam, Laos, Thailand, and Cambodia.

References

duperreana
Trees of Thailand
Trees of Cambodia
Trees of Laos
Trees of Vietnam
Trees of Indo-China